Kar Plateau is a small, mainly snow-covered plateau with an almost vertical rock scarp marking its southern side, standing on the west side of Granite Harbour, just north of the terminus of Mackay Glacier, in Victoria Land, Antarctica. The plateau rises gently toward the northwest to the heights of Mount Marston. It was mapped and named by the British Antarctic Expedition, 1910–13, "kar" being a Turkish word meaning snow.

See also
Kappen Cliffs

References

Plateaus of Antarctica
Landforms of Victoria Land
Scott Coast